Steve Hayes is an English businessman, and was the owner of Aviva Premiership rugby union side London Wasps.

Originally a double glazing salesman, Hayes also worked for his father-in-law selling secondary mortgages. In 1997 with David Cowham he founded loans.co.uk, a Watford headquartered finance broker. Hayes became Chief Executive, expanding the firm to become the UK's then leading finance broker, on an earnings package of £5.5million in 2004/2005. In June 2005, Cowham and Hayes sold loans.co.uk to MBNA for an undisclosed amount, reported to be worth £50million to each partner.

Hayes became a 25% shareholder through an initial £250,000 investment in Wycombe Wanderers in June 2004, when the football club became a plc, and later became managing director. Hayes bought an 11.6% stake in London Wasps Holdings Ltd in August 2007, and became chairman of Lawrence Dallaglio's benefit committee. In December 2008, Hayes bought Chrysalis Records founder Chris Wright's controlling interest and John O'Connell's shareholding in London Wasps to take complete control, and in July 2009, following a shareholders' meeting, he took full ownership of Wycombe Wanderers, in the process writing off £3m of the club's debt to him in exchange for shares.

Between 2009-2012 Hayes’ plan to build a new 17,500 stadium and destination venue, on Booker Airfield High Wycombe, for both clubs, was backed by Wycombe District Council. When Lesley Clarke stepped down as Leader, his replacement Alex Collingwood led a successful campaign against the plans.

In June 2012, Hayes sold the football club to Wycombe Wanderers Trust and the rugby club to David Thorn.

Between 2014-2020, Hayes was Chairman and a founding shareholder of Open Property Group that became the most successful cash property buyers in the UK, creating a portfolio of 100+ rental properties, worth in excess of £10M.

Since 2018 Hayes has been running Open Limited, his own small property development business, whilst also active as a non-executive director to several other SMEs.

References

Year of birth missing (living people)
Living people
English businesspeople
Wycombe Wanderers F.C.
Wasps RFC
English football chairmen and investors
English rugby union chairmen and investors